The Pool of the 2002 Fed Cup Asia/Oceania Zone Group II composed of five teams competing in a round robin competition. The top two teams qualified for Group I next year.

Malaysia vs. Singapore

Pacific Oceania vs. Syria

Pacific Oceania vs. Kazakhstan

Singapore vs. Syria

Malaysia vs. Syria

Kazakhstan vs. Singapore

Pacific Oceania vs. Malaysia

Kazakhstan vs. Syria

Malaysia vs. Kazakhstan

Pacific Oceania vs. Singapore

  and  advanced to Group I for next year, where they respectively placed fifth and last in the same pool of six. Kazakhstan, thus, was relegated back down to Group II for 2004.

See also
Fed Cup structure

References

External links
 Fed Cup website

2002 Fed Cup Asia/Oceania Zone